The Amherstburg Formation is a geologic formation in Ontario, Canada and Michigan, United States. It preserves fossils dating back to the Devonian period.

See also

 List of fossiliferous stratigraphic units in Ontario

References
 

Devonian Ontario
Devonian southern paleotemperate deposits
Devonian Michigan